Binanderean–Goilalan is a language family of New Guinea, proposed by Timothy Usher under the name Oro – Wharton Range, that unites the Binanderean (Guhu–Oro) and Goilalan (Wharton Range) families and the Purari isolate:

Binanderean languages
Goilalan languages
Purari language

References

External links 
 Timothy Usher, New Guinea World, Oro–Wharton Range

 
Language families
Papuan languages